The Federated States of Micronesia participated in the 2010 Summer Youth Olympics in Singapore.

The Micronesian squad consisted of 3 athletes competing in 2 sports: aquatics (swimming) and athletics.

Athletics

Girls
Track and Road Events

Swimming

References

External links
Competitors List: Micronesia

Nations at the 2010 Summer Youth Olympics
You
Federated States of Micronesia at the Youth Olympics